B is for Beer is a novella by Tom Robbins published in 2009 by HarperCollins.  It is presented as a children's book, about  Gracie Perke, a young girl exploring the world of beer. She learns why every adult enjoys it and why she's not allowed to drink it.

Musical Adaptation
The book was subsequently adapted into a musical, "B Is for Beer: The Musical", co-written by Robbins and Ben Lee.

Release details
 Hardcover –  published on April 21, 2009, by HarperCollins
 CD Audio Book -  published on April 21, 2009, by HarperCollins
 E-Book –  published on April 21, 2009, by HarperCollins

References

2009 American novels
Novels by Tom Robbins
American children's novels
HarperCollins books
Works about beer
2009 children's books